Paraorthacodus is an extinct genus of cartilaginous fish. An unidentified species has been found in the Hasle Formation of Bornholm, Denmark.

References

Jurassic sharks
Prehistoric shark genera
Palaeospinacidae
Fossils of Denmark
Hasle Formation